Lazarus Geiger (21 May 1829 – 29 August 1870) was a German-Jewish philosopher and philologist.

Life
He was born at Frankfurt-on-Main, was destined to commerce, but soon gave himself up to scholarship and studied at Marburg, Bonn and Heidelberg. From 1861 till his sudden death in 1870 he was professor in the Jewish high school at Frankfurt. His chief aim was to prove that the evolution of human reason is closely bound up with that of language. He further maintained that the origin of the Indo-Germanic language is to be sought not in Asia but in central (Germany). He was a convinced opponent of rationalism in religion.

Bibliography
Lazarus Geiger's chief work was Ursprung und Entwickelung der menschlichen Sprache und Vernunft (vol. i., Stuttgart, 1868), the principal results of which appeared in a more popular form as Der Ursprung der Sprache (Stuttgart, 1869 and 1878). The second volume of the former was published in an incomplete form (1872, 2nd ed. 1899) after his death by his brother Alfred Geiger.

Alfred Geiger also published a number of Lazarus Geiger's scattered papers as Zur Entwickelung der Menschheit (1871, and ed. 1878; Eng. trans. D. Asher, Hist. of the Development of the Human Race, London, 1880).

Notes

References

Attribition
 – See towards the end of his uncle's article. Endnots:
Keller, J. (1883). L. Geiger und der Kritik der Vernunft. Wertheim.
Keller, J. (1883). Der Ursprung der Vernunft.  Heidelberg.
Peschier, E. (1871) L. Geiger, sein Leben und Denken.
Rosenthal, L.A. (1883).  Lazarus Geiger: seine Lehre vom Ursprung d. Sprache und Vernunft und sein Leben.Stuttgart.

Further reading

 – full translated text.

External links
Jewish Encyclopedia: "Geiger, Lazarus (Eliezer Solomon)" by Isidore Singer & A. Geiger (1906).

19th-century German philosophers
German philologists
1829 births
1870 deaths
University of Marburg alumni
University of Bonn alumni
Heidelberg University alumni